Rodrigo Arenas Betancourt (23 October 1919 – 14 May 1995) was a Colombian sculptor. At the time of his death in 1995 he was recognized as one of the most important sculptors in Colombia and Latin America. Most of the major cities in Colombia have statues sculpted by Arenas Betancourt.

Arenas Betancourt died on 14 May 1995 in the municipality of Caldas, located in the southern end of the Valley of Aburrá and part of the Medellín Metropolitan Area.

His bronze statues are characterized by their enormous proportions and dramatic expression.

Examples of his artwork are:
Naked Bolívar in Pereira 
Monumento a la Raza, bronze and concrete, 38 m height, located in La Alpujarra Administrative Center in Medellín
 Sculptural Complex Vargas Swamp Lancers near Paipa is the largest sculpture in Colombia.
Monument to Effort in Armenia
Monument to the Marching Revolution in Valledupar
Monument to the founders in Bogotá (installed 1965)
Statue of Simón Bolívar in Bogotá (installed 1963)
Additionally to sculpture, Arenas Betancourt worked in printmaking and book illustration.

Gallery

References

People from Antioquia Department
1919 births
1995 deaths
20th-century Colombian sculptors